Linfen Yaodu Airport  is an airport serving the city of Linfen in Shanxi Province, China. It is located near the town of Qiaoli in Yaodu District, 15 kilometers from the city center. The airport was first built in 1958 and opened on 1 January 1960, but ceased operations in fall 1965. Construction started again in September 2010 to expand and reopen the airport with an investment of 446 million yuan, and it was originally projected to open in late 2011.

Linfen Airport opened to commercial traffic on 25 January 2016. The airport was formerly known as Linfen Qiaoli Airport until April 2020.

Facilities
The airport will have one runway that is 2,600 meters long and 45 meters wide, and a 4,200 square meter terminal building. It is projected to handle 430,000 passengers annually by 2020.

Airlines and destinations

See also
List of airports in China
List of the busiest airports in China

References

Airports in Shanxi
Airports established in 2016
2016 establishments in China